Abdelkader Zoukh  (born 24 January 2002), is an Algerian professional footballer who plays as a defender for Qatar Stars League side Al-Wakrah.

Career statistics

Club

References

External links
 

2002 births
Living people
Qatari footballers
Association football defenders
Al-Wakrah SC players
Qatar Stars League players